() is a type of argot in the French language, featuring inversion of syllables in a word, and is common in slang and youth language.  It rests on a long French tradition of transposing syllables of individual words to create slang words. The word  itself is an example of verlan (making it an autological word). It is derived from inverting the sounds of the syllables in l'envers ("the inverse", frequently used in the sense of "back-to-front").

Word formation 

Words in verlan are formed by switching the order in which syllables from the original word are pronounced.  For example,   becomes  .

Verlan generally retains the pronunciation of the original syllables.

The study of written verlan is difficult as it is primarily passed down orally, without standardized spelling. While some still argue that the letters should be held over from the original word, in the case of verlan, most experts agree that words should be spelled as to best approximate pronunciation.

Different rules apply for one-syllable words, and words with multiple syllables may be verlan-ised in more than one way.

Vocabulary 
The purpose of verlan is to create a somewhat secret language that only its speakers can understand. Words becoming mainstream is counterproductive. As a result, such newly common words are re-verlan-ised: reversed a second time .

Some verlan words, which are now well incorporated in common French language, have taken on their own significance, or at least certain connotations that have changed their meaning. For example, the word , which can still be used to refer to any woman, also refers to the speaker's girlfriend, when used in the possessive form ( → my girl); while the original word  would refer to the speaker's wife when used in the same way ( → my wife). Such words retain a cultural significance from the time at which they appeared in common language. The re-verlan-ised word  is much more recent, and evolved to refer more generally to people of Arab descent who live in France.

In theory, any word can be made into a verlan, but only a few expressions are used in everyday speech. Verbs translated into verlan cannot be conjugated easily. There is no such thing as a verlan grammar, so generally verbs are used in the infinitive, past participle or progressive form.  For example:
J'étais en train de pécho une bebon ("I was hitting on a hot chick") is said, but not .

Here are some examples of French words that have been verlanised and their English meanings:

Double verlan 
Verlanising words often brings up words that are verlan of a verlan. One can find the order of the consonants of the original word, but the vowels have been modified.

For example,  (verlan of ) becomes .

Cultural significance 
Verlan is less a language than a way to set apart certain words. Many verlan words refer either to sex or drugs, related to the original purpose of keeping communication secret from institutions of social control. Verlan is generally limited to one or two key words per sentence. Verlan words and expressions are mixed within a more general  language.

Speakers rarely create a verlan word on the fly; rather, their ability to use and understand words from an accepted set of known verlan terms allows them to be identified as part of a verlan-speaking group. Lefkowitz claims that the best speakers of the language are often the worst students, those most needing to hide from authority.

Some verlan words have gained mainstream currency.

Verlan is popular as a form of expression in French hip-hop.  Artists claim that it fits well with the musical medium because "form ranks way over substance".

Voltaire, the nom-de-plume of François-Marie Arouet, is possibly a verlan word for Airvault.

See also 

 Back slang
 Language game
 Louchébem
 Lunfardo, which has some reverse words
 Pig Latin
 Podaná
 Rhyming slang
 Šatrovački (in Serbo-Croatian)
 Shelta
 Totoiana (in Romanian)
 Tougo (in Japanese)
 Vesre (in Spanish)

References

External links 

French slang
Language games
Cant languages
Hip hop terminology